The 1988–89 2. Bundesliga season was the fifteenth season of the 2. Bundesliga, the second tier of the German football league system.

Fortuna Düsseldorf and FC Homburg were promoted to the Bundesliga while Kickers Offenbach, Viktoria Aschaffenburg, 1. FSV Mainz 05 and Union Solingen were relegated to the Oberliga.

League table
For the 1988–89 season Eintracht Braunschweig, Hertha BSC, Viktoria Aschaffenburg and 1. FSV Mainz 05 were newly promoted to the 2. Bundesliga from the Oberliga while FC Schalke 04 and FC Homburg had been relegated to the league from the Bundesliga.

Results

Top scorers 
The league's top scorers:

References

External links
 2. Bundesliga 1988/1989 at Weltfussball.de 
 1988–89 2. Bundesliga at kicker.de 

1988-89
2
Ger